Kenji Tomita (富田健治 November 1, 1897 – March 23, 1977) was a Japanese politician. He was born in Kobe. He graduated from Kyoto University. He was governor of Nagano Prefecture (1938–1940), served as Cabinet Secretary under Fumimaro Konoe, and was elected to the House of Representatives in 1952. He was a recipient of the Order of the Sacred Treasure.

Tomita was a keen martial artist, studying judo and aikido. He used his influence to protect aikido's founder Morihei Ueshiba from arrest during the Second Oomoto Incident in 1935 and was the first chairman of the Aikikai.

References

1897 births
1977 deaths
Governors of Nagano
Japanese Home Ministry government officials
Japanese Police Bureau government officials
Recipients of the Order of the Sacred Treasure, 2nd class
People from Kobe
Kyoto University alumni